Cass Lowe is a British songwriter, record producer, musician and singer, best known for his Grammy Award and Ivor Novello-winning collaborations with Jesse & Joy, Snakehips and Chance the Rapper.

Career
Lowe has produced and co-written songs with and for artists including Tinashe, Zayn, Chance The Rapper, Little Mix, Rudimental, Fifth Harmony, Clean Bandit, Charli XCX, James Arthur, MØ and Take That.
In 2016, he won the Ivor Novello award for Best Contemporary Song with Snakehips for co-writing their song, "All My Friends", feat. Chance The Rapper and Tinashe.  Lowe won the award for Songwriter Of The Year at the 2016 A&R awards.

Songwriting and production credits
Cass Lowe has primarily been known for collaborating on hits with production duo Snakehips on a lot of their most recent releases. Others include the collaborators listed below.

Awards

References

Year of birth missing (living people)
Living people
British male singer-songwriters
British record producers